CERIA (French) or COOVI (Dutch) is a Brussels Metro station on the western branch of line 5. It is located in the municipality of Anderlecht, in the western part of Brussels, Belgium. It serves the Food and Chemical Industries Education and Research Center (CERIA/COOVI), after which it is named.

The station opened on 15 September 2003 as part of the Bizet–Erasme/Erasmus extension of former line 1B including the stations Erasme/Erasmus, Eddy Merckx and La Roue/Het Rad. Following the reorganisation of the Brussels Metro on 4 April 2009, it is served by line 5.

External links

Brussels metro stations
Railway stations opened in 2003
Anderlecht